Henderson is a city in Mills County, Iowa, United States. The population was 144 at the time of the 2020 census.

History
No buildings existed where the community lies in 1875. A community had formed by February 1877 as records show residents were forming a Church of Christ. The community was original named Potter. Workers for railroad stayed local farmer Dave Henderson's yard and named the place Henderson Crossing; it was later shorted to Henderson. Henderson was platted in 1880.

Geography
Henderson is located at  (41.139095, -95.431300).

Demographics

2010 census
As of the census of 2010, there were 185 people, 74 households, and 46 families living in the city. The racial makeup of the city was 99.5% White and 0.5% from two or more races. Hispanic or Latino of any race were 0.5% of the population.

There were 74 households, of which 27.0% had children under the age of 18 living with them, 52.7% were married couples living together, 6.8% had a female householder with no husband present, 2.7% had a male householder with no wife present, and 37.8% were non-families. 28.4% of all households were made up of individuals, and 10.8% had someone living alone who was 65 years of age or older. The average household size was 2.50 and the average family size was 3.07.

The median age in the city was 40.9 years. 23.8% of residents were under the age of 18; 7% were between the ages of 18 and 24; 23.2% were from 25 to 44; 29.2% were from 45 to 64; and 16.8% were 65 years of age or older. The gender makeup of the city was 49.7% male and 50.3% female.

2000 census
As of the census of 2000, there were 171 people, 74 households, and 46 families living in the city. The racial makeup of the city was 99.42% White, 0.58% from other races. Hispanic or Latino of any race were 1.17% of the population.

There were 74 households, out of which 27.0% had children under the age of 18 living with them, 50.0% were married couples living together, 9.5% had a female householder with no husband present, and 36.5% were non-families. 31.1% of all households were made up of individuals, and 18.9% had someone living alone who was 65 years of age or older. The average household size was 2.31 and the average family size was 2.89.

22.8% are under the age of 18, 5.8% from 18 to 24, 22.8% from 25 to 44, 26.9% from 45 to 64, and 21.6% who were 65 years of age or older. The median age was 44 years. For every 100 females, there were 96.6 males. For every 100 females age 18 and over, there were 94.1 males.

The median income for a household in the city was $45,000, and the median income for a family was $49,688. Males had a median income of $27,500 versus $21,786 for females. The per capita income for the city was $32,175. None of the families and 1.9% of the population were living below the poverty line, including no under eighteens and 6.1% of those over 64.

Education
The community is within the East Mills Community School District.

References

Cities in Iowa
Cities in Mills County, Iowa
1880 establishments in Iowa
Populated places established in 1880